The  Philadelphia Soul season was the tenth season for the franchise in the Arena Football League. The team is coached by Clint Dolezel and play their home games at the Wells Fargo Center. The Soul improved from their disappointing 9-9 record to 15-3. The Soul finished undefeated at home, the only team of the season to do so.

Standings

Schedule

Regular season
The 2015 regular season schedule was released on December 19, 2014.

Playoffs

Roster

References

Philadelphia Soul
Philadelphia Soul seasons
Philadelphia Soul